The college of Six Preachers of Canterbury Cathedral was created by Archbishop Thomas Cranmer as part of the reorganisation of the monastic Christ Church Priory into the new secular Cathedral. 
First mentioned in a letter of Cranmer to Thomas Cromwell in 1540, the Six Preachers were established by the Statutes of 1541.
They were provided with houses in the Precincts but quickly became non-resident and rented out their properties.
They had the right to dine with the Dean and Canons and to sit in the stalls in the quire with the canons during services.
They were required to preach 20 sermons a year in their own parishes or in a church dependent on the Cathedral, as well as preaching in the Cathedral.

There has been an unbroken succession of Six Preachers from 1544 to the present day. In 1982 one of the twentieth-century Six Preachers, Canon Derek Ingram Hill, marked the appointment of the 200th Six Preacher with the publication of a small book detailing the history of the institution and giving a short biography of each of its occupants.

Notable Six Preachers 
 John Scory : 1541
 Lancelot Ridley : 1541–1554, 1560–
 Richard Turner : 1550
 Thomas Beccon : c. 1550
 Rowland Taylor : 1551
 Richard Clarke : 1602
 Richard Culmer : 1644
 John Cooke : 1687
 Thomas Wise : 1711
 John Duncombe : c.1760
 Evelyn Levett Sutton : 1811 (see under  Charles Manners-Sutton)
 Henry John Todd: 1818
 Thomas Bartlett: 1832
 Francis Nixon : 1841
 Francis James Holland : 1859
 Randall Thomas Davidson 1882
 Richard Hodgson : 1908
 John A. T. Robinson : 1958
 Derek Ingram Hill : 1964
 Michael Green
 Michael Battle : 2010
 Tory Baucum : 2014

References

Canterbury Cathedral